The following is the discography of Roxanne Shante, an American rapper.

Albums

Studio albums

Compilation albums

EPs

Singles

As lead artist

B-sides

Featured singles

Promotional singles

Guest appearances

Soundtrack television and film appearances 
 Colors (1988)
 Lean on Me (1989)
 Girls Town (1996)
 Sisters in the Name of Rap (1992)
 Roxanne Roxanne (Executive Producer) (2017)

Sampling 
 Have a Nice Day – Hot Pants Road, The JB's
 Knocking Hiney – Theme from Shaft, Isaac Hayes
 My Groove Gets Better – Think, Lyn Collins
 Skeezer – Games People Play, Sweet G

References

Notes

Citations 

Hip hop discographies
Discographies of American artists